Todd Blythe (born March 31, 1985) is a former gridiron football player who played in the Arena Football League (AFL). He was signed by the New Orleans Saints as an undrafted free agent in 2008. He played college football at Iowa State University.  He is currently serving as an offensive assistant for the Northern Iowa Panthers.

College

Blythe is one of the most prolific receivers in Iowa State Cyclone history. He started all 45 games he played in for Iowa State and holds the school career records in receiving yards with 3,096 and receiving touchdowns with 31. The only player with more receptions than his 171 is former Iowa State wide receiver Allen Lazard.

Blythe earned his degree in liberal arts in 2008.

2008

After his senior year of college, Blythe went undrafted in the 2008 NFL Draft. He then spent some of the year with the New Orleans Saints.

2009

Blythe was signed by the Saskatchewan Roughriders of the Canadian Football league but was released 5 months later.

2010

In 2010, Blythe returned to his home state of Iowa, and was signed by the Iowa Barnstormers of the Arena Football League. That year, he caught 66 passes for 826 yards and 22 touchdowns.

2011

Blythe played a second season in Iowa and caught 87 passes for 1181 yards and 27 touchdowns.

2012

Todd Blythe remained a free agent throughout the 2012 playing season.

In 2012, Blythe accepted the position of wide receivers coach for the Northern Iowa Panthers football team. Prior to joining UNI, he spent two seasons with Simpson College in his hometown of Indianola, Iowa. He served as a wide receivers coach for the Simpson Storm.

2015

In 2015, Todd married long-time girlfriend Brittany (Benson) Blythe. She is a Nurse Practitioner in the Des Moines area. Todd is said to be working in medical sales.

Career receiving statistics

References

External links

 Northern Iowa profile
 Simpson profile
 Iowa State profile
 ESPN statistics

1985 births
Living people
American football wide receivers
Canadian football wide receivers
Iowa State Cyclones football players
Iowa Barnstormers players
New Orleans Saints players
Northern Iowa Panthers football coaches
Saskatchewan Roughriders players
Simpson Storm football coaches
Sportspeople from Ames, Iowa
People from Indianola, Iowa
Players of American football from Iowa